Isaiah Amir Mustafa (born February 11, 1974) is an American actor and former American football wide receiver. Mustafa is widely known as the main character in a series of Old Spice television commercials, "The Man Your Man Could Smell Like". He is also known for portraying Luke Garroway on Freeform's fantasy series Shadowhunters and adult Mike Hanlon in It Chapter Two.

Childhood
Mustafa was born in Portland, Oregon to Shahidah Mustafa-Davis and John Wali Mustafa, the youngest of seven children in a Muslim family. When Mustafa was 5 years old, the family relocated from Portland to Mission Viejo, California, and his father opened a limousine service in Laguna Hills. Several years after the family relocated to California, Mustafa's father was killed in a car accident.

He was educated at Santa Clara High School, and later attended Santa Monica College, before transferring to Moorpark College. Mustafa then studied history at Arizona State University, from which he graduated in 1995.

Career

Football
Mustafa played basketball and ran track at Santa Clara High School in Oxnard, California. He did not play high school football, but he tried out for Moorpark College's football team hoping for an athletic scholarship; he became a free safety, and later became a wide receiver.

After transferring to Arizona State University in 1995, Mustafa was a starting wide receiver for the Arizona State Sun Devils but had an unspecified "confrontation" with a coach and was benched his senior year. He played during the 1997 Rose Bowl between the then-undefeated Sun Devils (led by Mustafa's friend Jake Plummer) and the Ohio State Buckeyes.

Although Mustafa expected to become a high school teacher after graduation, a sports agent suggested that he try out for NFL teams. The Tennessee Oilers signed him to the practice squad, then sent him to NFL Europe's Barcelona Dragons in 1998. After a season on the Oakland Raiders and Cleveland Browns' practice squads in 1999, Mustafa attended the Seattle Seahawks' training camp in 2000.

Acting
After the Seahawks, Mustafa pursued an acting career, playing small roles on various television series, including Ugly Betty and Days of Our Lives.

In 2010, he signed a talent deal with NBC and appeared as a supporting role in the comedy film Horrible Bosses. Mustafa hosted the TBS special Funniest Commercials of the Year in both 2010 and 2011. In 2011, Mustafa guest-starred in two episodes of ABC's action drama series Charlie's Angels, portraying Detective Ray Goodson, an ex-boyfriend of one of the Angels. The following year, he guest-starred in two episodes of The CW's spy drama series Nikita, playing the role of Cyrus, a former agent for Division and a member of the "Dirty Thirty".

In April 2013, Mustafa appeared in a commercial for the Israeli beer Maccabee. The following year, he starred in the pilot episode of the USA Network comedy series Sirens as a police officer named Danny. In May 2015, it was announced that Mustafa would portray the werewolf Luke Garroway on the Freeform fantasy series Shadowhunters, based on The Mortal Instruments series of novels by Cassandra Clare.

In 2019, Mustafa played the adult Mike Hanlon (Chosen Jacobs in his younger version) in It Chapter Two, the sequel to the 2017 horror film It.

Old Spice
In February 2010, he gained sudden fame for his main role in the popular "The Man Your Man Could Smell Like" advertising campaign for Old Spice, which featured his monologues. Mustafa's first commercial in the series was directed by Tom Kuntz. Subsequently, a three-day session created a series of humorous, personalized YouTube videos, with Mustafa reprising the character from the original Old Spice commercial. These were directed at members of the public and celebrities who had asked him questions on websites such as reddit, Facebook and Twitter.

On July 26, 2011, Old Spice launched a new campaign on YouTube featuring a challenge between Mustafa and Fabio entitled Mano a Mano in el Baño. Mustafa said he wasn't worried, even though Fabio has been "the epitome of the sex symbol as a pitchman". Mustafa ultimately emerged as the winner. He resumed his work for Old Spice with a series of advertisements released in January 2014. The campaign featured several webpages selling false products directed at men, which were interrupted with Mustafa suggesting that men buy Old Spice instead. In August 2015, Mustafa once again appeared in Old Spice commercials, this time alongside Terry Crews.

Personal life
Mustafa has one daughter, Haley Mustafa, with his former wife. He previously dated professional wrestler and actress Catherine Joy Perry, better known by her ring name Lana. He married his girlfriend of two years, Lisa Mitchell, on May 26, 2018.

He owned a restaurant, Jo Jo's Barbecue, on Melrose Avenue in Los Angeles in 2000, but it has since closed.

Mustafa is a comic book fan; his knowledge of Doctor Doom's first name helped him win $47,000 on The Weakest Link, for a question on the first name of Doctor Frankenstein. The money helped him pursue his post-restaurateur goal of becoming an actor. Mustafa had expressed interest in playing comic book superhero Luke Cage, and appeared as Cage in a Marvel Comics web short, styled after his Old Spice commercials.

Filmography

Film

Television

Video games

References

External links

 
 

1974 births
21st-century American male actors
African-American male actors
American male film actors
American football wide receivers
American male television actors
Arizona State Sun Devils football players
Arizona State University alumni
Barcelona Dragons players
Living people
Male actors from Oxnard, California
Male actors from Portland, Oregon
Moorpark Raiders football players
Moorpark College alumni
Santa Monica College alumni
Sportspeople from Oxnard, California
Players of American football from Portland, Oregon
Sportspeople from Ventura County, California
African Americans in Oregon
21st-century African-American people
20th-century African-American people
African-American history in Portland, Oregon

it:Chapter 2